The 2000 US Open was a tennis tournament played on outdoor hard courts at the USTA National Tennis Center in New York City in New York in the United States. It was the 120th edition of the US Open and was held from 28 August through 10 September 2000.

Ai Sugiyama and Mahesh Bhupathi were the defending champions, but lost in first round to Karina Habšudová and David Rikl.

Arantxa Sánchez Vicario and Jared Palmer won the title, defeating Anna Kournikova and Max Mirnyi in the final 6–4, 6–3.

Seeds

Draw

Finals

Top half

Bottom half

External links
 Official Results Archive (WTA)
2000 US Open – Doubles draws and results at the International Tennis Federation

2000 US Open (tennis)
US Open (tennis) by year – Mixed doubles